Cissus alata, grape ivy, is a species of flowering plant in the family Vitaceae. It is native to the New World Tropics, from Mexico down to Bolivia, and over to Venezuela, Trinidad and Guyana. Under its synonym Cissus rhombifolia, the Venezuela treebine, it has gained the Royal Horticultural Society's Award of Garden Merit.

References

alata
Flora of Mexico
Flora of Central America
Flora of western South America
Flora of Venezuela
Flora of Trinidad and Tobago
Flora of Guyana
Plants described in 1763
Flora without expected TNC conservation status